This is a list of airports in Nova Scotia. It includes all Nav Canada certified and registered water and land airports, aerodromes and heliports in the Canadian province of Nova Scotia.



List of airports and heliports

The list is sorted by the name of the community served; click the sort buttons in the table header to switch listing order.

Defunct airports

References 

 
Nova Scotia
Airports